Internet blackout in Iran may refer to:

 Internet censorship in Iran
 2019 Internet blackout in Iran